Alfred Frank Millidge (1914 – 16 April 2012) was a British arachnologist who wrote several works on spiders. One of his best-known might be British Spiders, volumes I and II, which he co-wrote with G. H. Locket. In 1983, he became the first person to describe the spider species Walckenaeria crocea.

References

British arachnologists
Zoologists with author abbreviations
1914 births
2012 deaths